Uzunköy is a village in the Adıyaman District, Adıyaman Province, Turkey. The village is populated by Kurds of the Reşwan tribe and had a population of 243 in 2021.

Notable people 

 Yakup Taş

References

Villages in Adıyaman District
Kurdish settlements in Adıyaman Province